Nestoras Kommatos (Greek: Νέστορας Κόμματος; born May 4, 1977) is a Greek former professional basketball player and, as of recently, the team manager for Larisa (formerly known as Ermis Agias) of the Greek Basket League. During his pro club career, at a height of 6'8" (2.03 m) tall, he played at the small forward, power forward and center positions.

Professional career
Kommatos began his career with the youth teams of Perseas Larissas. He then transferred to the Greek club Gymnastikos S. Larissas, in 1996. In 2000, he transferred to the Greek team Makedonikos. He then moved to the Greek team PAOK, where he stayed for a year, and then to the Greek team Aris.

In 2005, Kommatos moved to the Israeli Super League basketball giants Maccabi Tel Aviv, and he won the EuroLeague's 2005 championship with them. He then played with Fortitudo Bologna in the Italian League, and then with Sevilla in the Spanish League. In 2006, he played with the Greek club AEK Athens, and in 2007, he moved to the Russian club Lokomotiv Rostov.

Kommatos joined the Greek League club AEL 1964, for the 2008–09 season. In the 2009–10 season, he played with the Greek club Gymnastikos Olympia. In the 2010–11 season, he played with the Greek club Maroussi and the Turkish club Mersin.

Kommatos began the 2011–12 season with Maroussi, and in February 2012, he moved to Sant'Antimo of the Italian Second Division, to replace Milivoje Božović, who was out for the remainder of the season, due to an injury. He played with the Geek club Rethymno, during the 2012–13 season. He joined the Greek club Trikala Aries, on 13 September 2013.

He then moved to the Greek club Kolossos Rodou, before joining the Greek club Ermis Agias Larissa, where he finished his career, spending his last five active seasons.

National team career
Kommatos was also a member of the senior Greek national basketball team. With Greece's senior national team, he had 5 caps (games played).

Personal life
Kommatos is the son of a Greek father, and a Guyanese mother. His nickname is "NES".

Awards and accomplishments
2× Greek League All-Star: (2003, 2004)
Greek All-Star Game MVP: (2004)
Greek Cup Winner: (2004)
Greek Cup MVP: (2004)
Israeli State Cup Winner: (2005)
EuroLeague Champion: (2005)
Israeli League Champion: (2005)
Triple Crown Winner: (2005)
Italian Supercup Winner: (2005)

References

External links 
Euroleague.net Profile
FIBA Europe Profile
Draftexpress.com Profile
Eurobasket.com Profile
Spanish League Profile 
Italian League Profile 
Greek Basket League Profile 
Turkish League Profile
AEK Profile
Hellenic Basketball Federation Profile 

1977 births
Living people
AEK B.C. players
A.E.L. 1964 B.C. players
Aries Trikala B.C. players
Aris B.C. players
Centers (basketball)
Fortitudo Pallacanestro Bologna players
Greek men's basketball players
Greek people of Guyanese descent
Greek Basket League players
Greek expatriate basketball people in Israel
Greek expatriate basketball people in Italy
Greek expatriate basketball people in Russia
Greek expatriate basketball people in Spain
Gymnastikos S. Larissas B.C. players
Israeli Basketball Premier League players
Kolossos Rodou B.C. players
Larisa B.C. players
Liga ACB players
PBC Lokomotiv-Kuban players
Maccabi Tel Aviv B.C. players
Makedonikos B.C. players
Maroussi B.C. players
Olympia Larissa B.C. players
P.A.O.K. BC players
Basketball players from Larissa
Power forwards (basketball)
Real Betis Baloncesto players
Rethymno B.C. players
Small forwards
Trikala B.C. players
Zob Ahan Isfahan BC players